Maguliwa, also known as Magulilwa, is an administrative ward in the Iringa Rural district of the Iringa Region of Tanzania. In 2016 the Tanzania National Bureau of Statistics report there were 14,271 people in the ward, from 13,639 in 2012.

Villages / vitongoji 
The ward has 6 villages and 36 vitongoji.

 Magulilwa
 Godown A
 Godown B
 Godown C
 Ilala
 Kihesakilolo
 Majengo
 Mbavi
 Mifugo
 Sekuse
 Ng’enza
 Kinyaminyi
 Lutengelo
 Masela
 Mlevela
 Muungano
 Msuluti
 Igunga
 Kihesakilolo
 Milanzi
 Mlowa
 Msukwa
 Mwaya
 Mlanda
 Ilembula
 Mlanda A
 Mlanda B
 Msombe
 Nyalawe
 Ukang’a
 Negabihi
 Igeleke
 Isoliwaya
 Kilimahewa
 Letengano
 Muungano
 Ndiwili
 Kitanzini
 Madukani
 Matema
 Migoli A
 Migoli B
 Mivinjeni
 Msuluti A
 Msuluti B
 Mtakuja

References 

Wards of Iringa Region